Egypt, which does not  border Syria, became a major destination for Syrian refugees since 2012 following the election of Egyptian President Mohamed Morsi, who was a critic of Bashar al-Assad in the Syrian Civil War. As of 2016, there are 114,911 registered Syrian refugees living in Egypt. 

The country is also under the Regional Refugee and Resilience Plan (3RP), a coordination effort between countries neighboring Syria (Jordan, Lebanon, Turkey, Iraq), Egypt, and UN agencies with NGOs including UNHCR and 240 partners.

Refugee Conditions in Egypt

Employment 
Egypt has a large informal market and most Syrians work in it. There are cafés in this informal market where a majority of unregistered Syrians work. The majority of Syrian registered with UNHCR have a higher chance of receiving a job because they are in Egypt legally. It is not a simple task to gain employment because of Egypt's reservation on refugee access to the labor market in the 1951 refugee convention.

Housing 
In Egypt, refugees are allowed to live in the cities unlike some of their neighboring countries. The majority of Syrians that registered with UNHCR have housing in Egypt because of their resettlement program. However, there are more barriers to entry in Egypt. There has been more detention as a means of housing and a holding ground before deportation.

Education

Public Schools 
In 2012, the president of Egypt granted Syrians access to the public school system and aid in registration. Education is free to Syrian Refugees but it does exclude post-graduate education. Students are required to have their passports and a copy of their transcript from Syria. If a student does not have their transcript they can take a placement exam to determine their level of education. Upon application for school Syrian students receive a document that gives them access to a one-year residency permit.

Refugee Schools 
There are Syrian learning centers in Egypt that differ from the public school system because they are accredited. These educational institutions are a source of jobs for Syrian teachers because they are not allowed to legally teach in the Egyptian public school system. These schools offer assistance with the Egyptian curriculum.

Healthcare 
Egypt with the help UNHCR and other NGOs mainstreamed healthcare for Syrian refugees and made their healthcare free. Mainstreaming effect refugees in urban areas like Cairo. There was standardization of the healthcare system and more transparency of the costs.

Services Provided 
 Birth Registration and certificate issuing
 Issuing of health cards
 Premarital care
 Antenatal care
 routine immunization
 Early detection of thyroxine hormone deficiency
 Infant feeding counseling and growth monitoring
 Management of childhood illness
 Adolescent care
 Medical Examinations
 Medicine Provisions
 Chronic illness treatment
 Dental Services

Egypt's Legal Reaction to Syrian Immigration 
In order to gain refugee status in Egypt it must be proved that the applicant has a well founded fear of persecution. After gaining refugee status you are given a UNHCR yellow card which gives you three year temporary residency permit. However, Egypt is having refugees renew their permits every six months.

Restrictions 
In July 2013, the Egyptian government required Syrian refugees to have entry visas, residency documents, and work permit before they could enter the country. Since the implementation of this law, 3,058 refugees have been detained for attempting to depart illegally by sea. 75 female refugees from multiple countries, including Syria, are being detained in prison for allegedly having fake passports, being undocumented, and attempting to depart. There is a high unemployment rate among refugees, due to the 1982 Article 11 of the Ministry of Labor's Ministerial Resolution that required employers to prove that no Egyptian national was available for a job before a work permit was issued to a refugee.

References

External links 
 http://data.unhcr.org/syrianrefugees/country.php?id=8
 https://www.thenation.com/article/why-syrian-refugees-risk-journey-death-europe/
 http://www.dailynewsegypt.com/2015/04/07/employment-detention-and-registration-on-syrian-refugees-in-egypt/
 lhttp://www.al-monitor.com/pulse/originals/2016/05/egypt-syria-students-refugees-education-schools-challenges.htm
 https://www.bbc.com/news/world-middle-east-35947086
 https://www.loc.gov/law/help/refugee-law/egypt.php

Syrian refugees
Refugees of the Syrian civil war
Egypt
2010s in Egypt